Epidauria strigosa is a species of snout moth in the genus Epidauria. It was described by Staudinger in 1879, and is known from Turkey, Greece, Romania, Bosnia and Herzegovina, Croatia, Spain and Portugal.

References

Moths described in 1879
Anerastiini
Moths of Europe
Moths of Asia